The 1868 Vermont gubernatorial election took place on September 8, 1868. Incumbent Republican John B. Page, per the "Mountain Rule", successfully ran for re-election to a second term as Governor of Vermont, defeating Democratic candidate John L. Edwards.

Results

References

Vermont
1868
Gubernatorial
September 1868 events